"L'Amourir" is a single by The Young Gods released as a single in 1988. It later appeared on the re-issue of their second album L'Eau Rouge in 1995.

Accolades
The information regarding accolades acquired from AcclaimedMusic.net

Track listing
 "L'Amourir" - 4:18
 "Pas Mal" - 2:46

Charts

References

The Young Gods songs
1988 singles
1988 songs
PIAS Recordings singles